Nepovirus is a genus of viruses in the order Picornavirales, in the family Secoviridae, in the subfamily Comovirinae. Plants serve as natural hosts. There are 40 species in this genus. Nepoviruses, unlike the other two genera (Comovirus and Fabavirus) in the subfamily Comovirinae, are transmitted by nematodes.

Taxonomy
The genus contains the following species:

Aeonium ringspot virus
Apricot latent ringspot virus
Arabis mosaic virus
Arracacha virus A
Artichoke Aegean ringspot virus
Artichoke Italian latent virus
Artichoke yellow ringspot virus
Beet ringspot virus
Blackcurrant reversion virus
Blueberry latent spherical virus
Blueberry leaf mottle virus
Cassava American latent virus
Cassava green mottle virus
Cherry leaf roll virus
Chicory yellow mottle virus
Cocoa necrosis virus
Crimson clover latent virus
Cycas necrotic stunt virus
Grapevine Anatolian ringspot virus
Grapevine Bulgarian latent virus
Grapevine chrome mosaic virus
Grapevine deformation virus
Grapevine fanleaf virus
Grapevine Tunisian ringspot virus
Hibiscus latent ringspot virus
Lucerne Australian latent virus
Melon mild mottle virus
Mulberry mosaic leaf roll associated virus
Mulberry ringspot virus
Myrobalan latent ringspot virus
Olive latent ringspot virus
Peach rosette mosaic virus
Potato black ringspot virus
Potato virus B
Potato virus U
Raspberry ringspot virus
Soybean latent spherical virus
Tobacco ringspot virus
Tomato black ring virus
Tomato ringspot virus

Structure
Viruses in Nepovirus are non-enveloped, with icosahedral geometries, and T=pseudo3 symmetry. The diameter is around 28-30 nm. Genomes are linear and segmented, bipartite, around 23.9kb in length.

Life cycle
Viral replication is cytoplasmic. Entry into the host cell is achieved by penetration into the host cell. Replication follows the positive stranded RNA virus replication model. Positive stranded RNA virus transcription is the method of transcription. The virus exits the host cell by tubule-guided viral movement.
Plants serve as the natural host. The virus is transmitted via a vector (nematodes, mite, and  thrips). Transmission routes are vector.

Genome 
Nepoviruses are classified as type IV viruses under the Baltimore classification system, and consequently contain bipartite, linear, single stranded positive sense RNA genomes. The two genome segments are encapsulated separately into two different icosahedral particles.  Each of the genome segments produces a different polypeptide, which undergoes a series of steps (i.e. proteolysis, and other post-translational modifications) in order to produce a functional protein.

RNA1 
The first segment (RNA1) is approximately 8,000 nucleotides in length and appears as a single copy in each B type virion.  It encodes the proteins that are important in replication and is the first gene to be activated.

RNA2 
The second segment (RNA2) is approximately 4,000–7,000 nucleotides in length and usually appears as a single copy in each M type virion.  It encodes the proteins that are important in cell-cell transmission and evasion of cellular defenses.

References

External links
 Viralzone: Nepovirus
 ICTV
UniProt Taxonomy 

Nepoviruses
Virus genera